Retków may refer to the following places in Poland:
Retków, Lower Silesian Voivodeship (south-west Poland)
Retków, Masovian Voivodeship (east-central Poland)